The Market House Museum is a small museum in Watchet, Somerset, England.

The building on Market Street was constructed in 1820 on the site of the previous market house which had been demolished in 1805. It was converted into a museum in 1979. It is a Grade II listed building.

It houses a collection of exhibits about the natural history of Watchet and the surrounding area. The focus is on nautical and maritime history of the port.

Artefacts include those relating to: Archaeology, Coins and Medals, Land Transport, Maritime, Natural Sciences, Science and Technology and Social History.

At the rear of the museum building is the old town lock up.

References

External links
Watchet House Museum - official site

Museums in Somerset
History of Somerset
Grade II listed buildings in West Somerset
Local museums in Somerset
Museums established in 1979
1979 establishments in England
Grade II listed museum buildings
Watchet